Eight Men Speak is a Canadian agitprop play written in 1933 by a committee of E. Cecil-Smith, Mildred Goldberg, Frank Love, and Oscar Ryan. The play made only one performance in its initial run then was suppressed by the Canadian government. Its suppression became a political embarrassment for Prime Minister R. B. Bennett. The publicity helped cause the release of the eight imprisoned Communist Party leaders of the play's title.

Production
The offices of the Communist Party of Canada were raided by the Royal Canadian Mounted Police and eight of its members were arrested, including Tim Buck and Tom McEwen. They were released following a campaign demanding their release, which included a petition with 450,000 signatures, and 17,000 people attended a celebratory rally in Maple Leaf Gardens. E. Cecil-Smith, Mildred Goldberg, Frank Love, and Oscar Ryan wrote an agitprop play based on the events.

Release
The play's first performance at the Standard Theatre on 4 December 1933 had around 1,500 in attendance, but the police threatened to revoke the theatre's license.

When the Progressive Arts Club had a meeting to protest this censorship, a former Manitoba Labour MLA, A. E. Smith, gave a speech endorsing the play and its presentation of the attempted assassination of the imprisoned Communist leader. Smith was arrested and charged with sedition. The resulting trial allowed Buck to take the stand and relate the events of the incident in open court. Smith was acquitted, and Buck and his comrades were soon released afterward.

References

Works cited

External links
Tim Buck Too, pg. 2

1933 in Canada
1933 plays
Canadian plays
Censorship in Canada
Censorship in the arts
Communism in Canada
Theatre controversies